The 1948 German Ice Hockey Championship was the 30th season of the German Ice Hockey Championship, the national championship of Germany. The first round consisted of Northern and Southern sections. The top three teams from each section qualified for the final round. SC Riessersee won the championship.

First round

North

South

Final round

References

External links
German ice hockey standings 1946-1958

German Ice Hockey Championship seasons
German
Champion